Erklärte Nacht ("Declared night") is a 2002 poetry collection by the German writer Durs Grünbein.

See also
 2002 in poetry
 German literature

References

External links
 Erklärte Nacht at the publisher's website

2002 poetry books
German poetry collections
Suhrkamp Verlag books